Hemiodus is a genus of halftooths from South America with the greatest species richness in the Amazon Basin, but also found in the Orinoco, Essequibo, Paraná–Paraguay and Parnaíba River basins.

Species
There are currently 21 recognized species in this genus:
 Hemiodus amazonum (Humboldt, 1821)
 Hemiodus argenteus Pellegrin, 1909
 Hemiodus atranalis (Fowler, 1940)
 Hemiodus goeldii Steindachner, 1908
 Hemiodus gracilis Günther, 1864
 Hemiodus huraulti (Géry, 1964)
 Hemiodus immaculatus Kner, 1858
 Hemiodus iratapuru Langeani & C. L. R. Moreira, 2013 
 Hemiodus jatuarana Langeani, 2004
 Hemiodus langeanii Beltrão & Zuanon, 2012
 Hemiodus microlepis Kner, 1858
 Hemiodus orthonops C. H. Eigenmann & C. H. Kennedy, 1903
 Hemiodus parnaguae C. H. Eigenmann & Henn, 1916
 Hemiodus quadrimaculatus Pellegrin, 1909 (Barred hemiodus)
 Hemiodus semitaeniatus Kner, 1858 (Halfline hemiodus)
 Hemiodus sterni (Géry, 1964)
 Hemiodus ternetzi G. S. Myers, 1927
 Hemiodus thayeria J. E. Böhlke, 1955
 Hemiodus tocantinensis Langeani, 1999
 Hemiodus unimaculatus (Bloch, 1794)
 Hemiodus vorderwinkleri (Géry, 1964)

References

Hemiodontidae
Characiformes genera
Taxa named by Johannes Peter Müller
Fish of South America